Rambazar (Nepali: रामबाजार) is the residential area which is located in Ward number 10 and 15 of Pokhara, Nepal.

Boundaries of Rambazar 

 East: Birendra Chowk
 West: SOS Village
 North: Buddha Chowk
 South: Nayagaun

Education 
SOS Hermann Gmeiner School Pokhara : SOS Children's Villages is the largest non-governmental organisation focused on supporting children without parental care and families at risk. It is located in Rambazar.

Rambazar Police Station 
Rambazar Police Station is located in Rambazar-10, Pokhara

Transportation 
Privately run public transport system operating throughout the city, adjoining townships and nearby villages. Pokhara Mahanagar Bus (green, brown and blue buses), Bindabashini Samiti (blue buses), Lekhnath Bus Bebasaya Samiti ( green and white buses) and Phewa Bus Bebasaya Samiti (mini micros) are public buses available in city. The public transport mainly consists of local and city buses, micros, micro-buses and metered-taxis.

Indian Gorkha Pension Camp 
Indian Gorkha Pension Camp is located in Rambazar. It was established in 1955 A.D.

Ram Bazar Festival 
Ram Bazar Festival is being held annually at Rambazar since 2012.

Bank 

 Shangri-la Development Bank, Rambazar Branch

Office 

 Classic Tech Internet operation center Rambazar

Communication 
Internet service providers in Rambazar are:
 Worldlink
 Nepal Telecom
 Vianet
 Classic Tech

References 

Neighbourhoods in Pokhara
Gandaki Province